Frank Conrad Hope Ross (2 July 1900 – 25 November 1975) was an Australian rules footballer who played with South Melbourne in the Victorian Football League (VFL).

Notes

External links 

1900 births
1975 deaths
Australian rules footballers from Victoria (Australia)
Sydney Swans players